Podsused – Vrapče is one of the districts of Zagreb, Croatia. It is located in the north-western part of the city. In 2011, the district had 45,759 inhabitants. Its area is 36.188 km2.

List of neighborhoods in Podsused – Vrapče
 Vrapče
 Susedgrad
 Podsused
 Gajnice
 Gornji Stenjevec

References

Districts of Zagreb